The Battle of Ostia was fought in 409 AD between the Visigoths and the Western Roman Empire. The battle was part of the invasion of Italy by the Visigothic king Alaric I. Having driven the emperor Honorius into Ravenna, Alaric laid siege to Rome. In order to support his siege, Alaric attacked the nearby city of Ostia at the mouth of the Tiber. He took the city port along with a massive amount of food supplies destined for the capital. A year after seizing Ostia, Alaric sacked Rome.

Sources
 

409
Ostia
Ostia
Ostia
Military history of Italy
Ostia